The Museum of Transport and Technology (MOTAT) is a science and technology museum located in Western Springs, Auckland, New Zealand. It is located close to the Western Springs Stadium, Auckland Zoo and the Western Springs Park. The museum has large collections of civilian and military aircraft and other land transport vehicles. An ongoing programme is in place to restore and conserve items in the collections. This work is largely managed by volunteers but, since the passing of the Museum of Transport and Technology Act in 2000, has been supported by full-time professional museum staff. New public programmes and facilities now promote the collections.

MOTAT was established in 1960 by a combination of groups including the Old Time Transport Preservation League, which was formed in 1957 and preserved trams and railway locomotives. MOTAT was formally opened in 1964.

MOTAT – Great North Road
MOTAT was built around the site of a beam engine pump house, which originally provided Auckland's water supply (system similar to the Crofton Pumping Station and Markfield Beam Engine). The Council engaged the services of famed engineer, William Errington, to design and construct the Pumphouse and Boiler house to provide the first pressurised water supply to Auckland. Adjacent swampland was excavated creating a  dammed lake, which is filled by three natural springs. This area is now the Western Springs Lake and parkland. The engine is a Double Woolf Compound built by John Key and Sons of Kirkcaldy in Scotland, who also built the long scrapped Lancashire boilers that originally provided the steam. The Western Springs Water Works officially opened in a small ceremony on 10 July 1877. The pumphouse was superseded by Auckland's extensive dam system and reticulation in 1928. Restoration and earthquake strengthening of the building was completed in 2002 and overhaul of the long dormant Beam Engine commenced at the start of 2005. On 11 October 2007 the engine moved under pneumatic pressure for the first time in 79 years and was finally tested under steam during the evening of 29 November the same year. The Beam engine was re-commissioned in a special public opening on 19 April 2008. A range of other early steam engines are kept in running order including a 1910 Tangye steam engine, an impressive 1911 triple-expansion engine built by Campbell Calderwood from Paisley, Scotland, which was formerly from the ill-fated Sydney Ferry The Greycliffe which sank on 3 November 1927 after being hit by the much larger Union Steam Ship Company's Royal Mail Steamship Tahiti with the loss of 40 lives. The engine ended its commercial life in the Tīrau dairy factory. Steam for the Beam Engine and other artifacts provided by a 1957 Daniel Adamson steam boiler, which was formerly used at Frankham's Mill, Te Puna.

Exhibits include trams, trains, vintage traction engines, carriages, cars, buses, trolleybuses and trucks, particularly fire engines, electrical equipment, space flight exhibits including a Corporal rocket and general science exhibits. There is also a 'colonial village' of early shops and houses, including a fencible cottage and a blacksmith shop.

The MOTAT printery demonstrates type making, type setting and printing on a variety of different manual and mechanical printing presses operated by Volunteers printing giveaways and small publications. A volunteer bindery group also demonstrate their talents and hold classes.

In the 1970s visitors to MOTAT were entertained by the MOTAT Chorus, a group of barbershop singers who later became the Auckland City of Sails Chorus.

The 'Pioneers of Aviation' Pavilion holds memorabilia of early aviators. The displays include miscellaneous parts from Richard Pearse's experimental aircraft, (together with research supporting the claim that he made uncontrolled hops/flights prior to the Wright brothers), a replica of the craft which was flown and his third aircraft (an attempt at a VTOL tilt rotor craft). The pavilion also holds relics from the Walsh Brothers' flights and school, and a library and archive of transport resources named in memory of the Walsh Brothers available to all MOTAT visitors and via the MOTAT website for virtual visitors. Also celebrated is Charles Kingsford Smith's trans-Tasman flight in the Southern Cross, Jean Batten's England–New Zealand flight and later record breaking efforts (her Percival Gull is exhibited at Auckland Airport). The larger civil aviation exhibits continue over at MOTAT 2 with displays relating to the Pan American Airways and Imperial Airways flying boats of the late 1930s and TEAL flying boats of the 40s and 50s. The engine from Jean Batten's Percival Gull is displayed at MOTAT 2.

The Road transport collection rotationally displays in excess of 100 cars, trucks, motorbikes and emergency vehicles. Some of the iconic vehicles in the collection include one of the first Trekka utility vehicles, New Zealand's only homegrown production vehicle built between 1966 and 1973, based on Czechoslovakian Škoda engines and chassis. Other vehicles include a 1960s Cooper Climax race car, an early American Brush Motor Car Company runabout, an International horseless carriage, an Austin Motor Company beer tanker (the first in New Zealand) and a wide number of other vehicles. Also in the collection is one of the Ferguson Company tractors which Edmund Hillary used to lay supply depots for the Commonwealth Trans-Antarctic Expedition, and with which he beat British explorer Dr Vivian Fuchs Sno-Cats to the South Pole on 3 January 1958.

MOTAT also houses a small collection of Police vehicles, including former New Zealand Transport Department, later New Zealand Ministry of Transport (M.O.T.) patrol cars and patrol motorbikes, the road policing duties of which were combined into the New Zealand Police in the early 1990s. The NZ Police Collection of 40 plus vehicles were housed at MOTAT for a number of years until 2011.

Trams are displayed at MOTAT 1 and operate daily between MOTAT 1's Great North Road Site, via Western Springs Park and Auckland Zoo to MOTAT 2. The extended line was opened by then-Prime Minister Helen Clark on Friday 27 April 2007.

MOTAT Aviation Hall – 98 Motions Road

MOTAT Aviation Hall's NZ$15 million extended aviation pavilion housing the "Sir Keith Park Memorial Aviation Collection" opened Friday 9 September 2011.

Also known in the past as the 'Sir Keith Park Memorial Airfield', named after Keith Park, the Battle of Britain and Battle of Malta hero, MOTAT's aviation collection is on a separate site, neighbouring the Waitematā Harbour and Auckland Zoo. It contains memorials to Fleet Air Arm and RAF Bomber Command pilots, radar and other aviation related material, as well as workshops for work on other vehicles, but the main feature is the collection of New Zealand's civil and some Royal New Zealand Air Force aircraft. A Grumman Avenger TBF-1 NZ2527 1943 torpedo bomber was completed in December 2013, it is a RNZAF Pacific combat veteran and representative of Avengers operated by the RN Fleet Air Arm. In November 2011 a Douglas A4K Skyhawk jetfighter was permanently loaned to MOTAT followed by a De Havilland Devon and Aermacchi MB-339 jet trainer in 2012. A BAC Strikemaster may join the collection from the RNZAF.

There is also a military section which restores and demonstrates a selection of Second World War military trucks, light tracked vehicles and tanks of Allied forces. The military section has regular open days when the Military Reenactment Society displays and demonstrates the vehicles and uniforms.

MOTAT Aviation Hall also has an operational railway with 1 km of track, stations and a selection of former New Zealand Government Railways, light industrial locomotives, wagons and carriages.

On 9 September 2011 a new and larger display hangar was opened at the MOTAT Aviation Hall. The existing blister hangar was moved and restored as part of the same project. With the construction of the new hangar it was now possible to display the restored De Havilland Mosquito and Lockheed Hudson. Short S25 Sunderland Mk V and Short S45A Solent Mk 4 were in moved inside as their overhauls and external painting was completed. Aircraft including the NAC DC3 Dakota can be seen inside the maintenance Blister Hanger.

Collections

MOTAT features several major collections of transport vehicles:
Aircraft collection – houses one of New Zealand's largest collections of civil and military aircraft, all with genuine New Zealand aviation pedigrees. These range from relics from Richard Pearse's first 1903 aircraft and an interpretive replica, as well as a large part of his original third vertical takeoff aircraft. 1930s de Havilland Fox Moth and Tiger Moth, 1930s Dragon Rapide, 1940s Short Solent double-decked flying boat, from New Zealand's first International Airline TEAL, a Short Sunderland marine patrol flying boat, De Havilland Mosquito wooden fighter bomber, a restored 1940s Avro Lancaster bomber, Douglas DC-3 Dakota through to a De Havilland Vampire 1950s jet fighter and most recently former RNZAF Douglas A-4 Skyhawk and Aermacchi MB-339CB advanced jet trainers. The aviation site of MOTAT located in Meola Road is also known as the Keith Park Memorial Airfield. A replica Hawker Hurricane is on a plinth in the markings OK-1 of New Zealander and RAF Air Chief Marshal Keith Park memorial at the entrance.
Railway locomotives and collection – includes seven steam locomotives from a pioneering 1874 NZR F class to the iconic NZR K class steam locomotive, smaller branch line, industrial and logging tank locomotives. Also six diesel, petrol and petrol electric locomotives, including the DA class which was built to replace the K class from the 1950s through the 1960s and became the most prolific mainline locomotive in New Zealand. This is operational and able to be viewed on Live Days which occur every third Sunday of the month.
Railway carriages – the collection also includes stations, carriages, wagons and other rolling stock.
Tram collection – the collection includes over 20 electric, steam and cable trams, many of which are operational, with support equipment and vehicles from former New Zealand tramway systems of Auckland, Wellington, Wanganui and the Mornington Cable tram system in Dunedin. Auckland's horse-drawn tramway opened in 1884 and was replaced by the electric tram system in 1902, closing in 1956. The final closure of an original street tramway was in Wellington in 1964. An 1883 Dunedin Cable Car trailer is the sole South Island tramway exhibit and there are additional trams from Melbourne and Sydney, Australia. Street furniture used on the Auckland Tramways can be seen on the Western Springs Tramway including traction pole skirts and cast iron pillar boxes dating from the 1900s, concrete safety zones, platform information signs, Cincinnati Recording Clocks, Queen Street Dispatchers Cabin all dating from the 1920s and some used into the trolleybus era. The museum is one of five operational Museum and Heritage Tramways in New Zealand.
Petrol / diesel bus collection – contains a significant collection of historic buses from the Auckland region, including a 1924 White Motor Company 4-cylinder side-valve petrol engine, wooden-bodied 23 seat omnibus, through a 1954 Bedford SB, petrol engine, 35-seat lightweight wooden-body bus specifically built for Grafton Bridge services, through to a 1978 M.A.N SL200 No.1603 retired in the 2010s.
Trolleybus collection – this collection contains a representative cross-section of trolleybuses which operated in Auckland between 1938 and 1980. First used on a 1 km department store-operated route in central Auckland from 1938, the trolleybus system later duplicated and then replaced the aging tram system between 1949 and 1956. The trolleybuses were in turn replaced by diesel buses in 1980.

Tram service

Tramlines on sleepered track set under bitumen were laid within the museum boundaries with trams commencing operation on 16 December 1967. The Museum tramline was later extended beyond the Museum grounds along Gt. North Road and opened on 19 December 1980. A further extension along Motions Road to Auckland Zoo commenced services on 5 December 1981 using rail set in mass concrete. In 2006–07 the tram line was further extended by a distance of 636 metres, to the aviation hangar at MOTAT 2, the service commencing on 27 April 2007. The tramway is dual gauge, employing 4-foot and 4-foot  inches gauges, the rail welded and set in mass concrete.

Trams are operated daily between MOTAT, alongside the Western Springs Park and precinct, past Auckland Zoo to the MOTAT Aviation Hall and connect both Museum sites.

See also 
MOTAT collections

References

External links

MOTAT – Museum of Transport and Technology (official website)
The MOTAT Society – Supporting Society of MOTAT

Aerospace museums in New Zealand
Automobile museums in New Zealand
Heritage railways in New Zealand
Heritage streetcar systems
Museums in Auckland
Railway museums in New Zealand
Science museums in New Zealand
Technology museums
Tramways with double-decker trams
1960 establishments in New Zealand
Museums established in 1960